The Search is a 1948 film directed by Fred Zinnemann and starring Montgomery Clift.

The Search may also refer to:

Film and television 
 The Search (2009 film), a 2009 Tibetan romance film
 The Search (2014 film), a 2014 remake of the 1948 film
 The Search (TV series), a British television series
 Crime Diaries: The Search, a Mexican crime web series
 Little Mix: The Search, a British television series
 "The Search" (Star Trek: Deep Space Nine), Star Trek: Deep Space 9 episode
 "The Search", third episode of the 1965 Doctor Who serial The Space Museum
 "The Search" (The Office), fifteenth episode of the seventh season of the U.S. version of The Office.
 "The Search", the name of an episode of the TV sitcom Punky Brewster
 "The Search",  the name of an episode of the cartoon He-Man and the Masters of the Universe
 "The Search", the name of a Catholic theology and philosophy video series

Books 
 The Search (novel), by Nobel Prize-winning author Naguib Mahfouz
 The Search, a novel by C. P. Snow
 The Search: How Google and Its Rivals Rewrote the Rules of Business and Transformed Our Culture, by John Battelle
 The Search, a novel by Nora Roberts
Avatar: The Last Airbender – The Search, a graphic novel released in 2013 
 "The Search" (short story), a time-travel short story by A. E van Vogt

Music 
 The Search: 1985–1989, retrospective CD from American hardcore punk band Bold
 The Search (Son Volt album), by alt-country band Son Volt
 The Search (NF album), a 2019 album by American rapper NF
 The Search (song), the title track and second single from the above album
 "The Search", a song by the Cherry Poppin' Daddies off their album Rapid City Muscle Car

See also
 Searching (disambiguation)